Allium yosemitense is a California species of wild onion known by the common name Yosemite onion. Most of the known populations are situated within the boundaries of Yosemite National Park.

Description
It has two long flat leaves that are usually slightly longer than the scape.

Distribution and habitat
Allium yosemitense is endemic to the central Sierra Nevada of California. Populations have been recorded in three counties: El Dorado, Mariposa and Tuolumne. Most of the sites are inside Yosemite National Park.

The habitats in which Allium yosemitense can be found include: California interior chaparral and foothill woodlands, Sierra Nevada lower montane forest (Yellow Pine Forest), Mediterranean California Lower Montane Black Oak-Conifer Forest (Mixed Evergreen Forest).

Allium yosemitense is listed by the State of California as Rare, and included in the California Native Plant Society—CNPS Inventory of Rare and Endangered Plants of California.

See also
List of plants of the Sierra Nevada (U.S.)

References

yosemitense
Endemic flora of California
Flora of the Sierra Nevada (United States)
Threatened flora of California
Yosemite National Park
Onions
Plants described in 1934
Taxa named by Alice Eastwood